Ettrick Bay is a wide, tidal, sandy coastal embayment with a chord of , on a 218° bearing, located on the west coast of the Isle of Bute in the Firth of Clyde, within council area of Argyll and Bute in Scotland. The bay was used for practice training for the D-Day landings.

Geography
The bay faces the Kyles of Bute, a narrow sea channel that separates the northern end of the Isle of Bute from the Cowal peninsula, and offers views of Isle of Arran. The bay is bounded by a coarse sandy beach which is popular with tourists and local people. A number of rivers flow into the bay, including the Glenmore Burn, Ettrick Burn, Drumachloy Burn and St Colmac Burn.

At the north end of the bay, which mainly consists of rocky outcrops, lies the Kildavanan Point, with the feature known as Macallister's Gun, located close to the point. At the south end of the bay is the rocky outcrop called Island McNeil, which forms the outer boundary of the bay.

The surrounding area is mostly rural with agriculture being the main land use. Average rainfall for the region is 392mm, compared to 331mm in Scotland as a whole. Windy Hill is the highest peak on the Isle of Bute. Other small hills surrounding the bay include: 

Eanan Hill to the north east – 
Glenabea Hill, behind Eanan Hill – 
Kilbride Hill, which bounds Windy Hill at the east side – 
Muirton Hill, which is to the south of Windy Hill – also  

To the east and south of the bay, all the hills are shallow.

 miles directly south of Ettrick Bay lies the sheltered bay of St Ninian's Bay, which is named after the 8th-century Christian saint Saint Ninian.

Settlements
Kames Castle and,  to the north, Wester Kames Castle stands near to Kames Bay.

Features
A well-known tourist attraction, and often associated together, they were built several thousand years apart. The church's manse, today known as Cnoc an Raer, is contemporary with the former place of worship. At the bridge over Glenmore Burn lie concrete frames built for the British Army for exercises on Inchmarnock. These frames represented practice landing craft for D-Day landings.

Gallery

References

Isle of Bute
Bays of Argyll and Bute